Ardozyga ananeura is a species of moth in the family Gelechiidae. It was described by Edward Meyrick in 1904. It is found in Australia, where it has been recorded from Queensland and New South Wales.

The forewings are light ochreous, sprinkled on the veins with fuscous and blackish. There is a small distinct black dot beneath the costa near the base. The stigmata are small, blackish, with the plical very obliquely beyond the first discal, an additional dot between and above the first and second discal, and another beneath the second discal. There are three triangular blackish marks on the upper part of the termen, the middle one largest. The hindwings are light grey.

References

Ardozyga
Moths described in 1904
Taxa named by Edward Meyrick
Moths of Australia